InLiving is an educational game focusing on independent living. Aimed at young people aged 13–25, the game has been developed by Creative North Studios and Kirklees Neighbourhood Housing for use by housing organisations as a tool to deliver key information to prospective and current tenants. The game helps players understand the challenges they may face when moving into a property for the first time. The game was launched on 5 June 2008.

Platform
The game was originally developed for mobile phones and currently supports over 500 different devices. A web-based version of the game is currently in development due for release late 2009.

Reception
The game has had positive reception since its launch in June 2008 and was soon featured in Inside Housing in the 'What Works' section. The InLiving project is also supported as part of the Innovation Exchange programme.

Spin-offs
Several other games have been developed based on the InLiving (Erudite) Platform. Two such games are HouseM8 and StreetM8.

References

External links
 InLiving Official Website

2008 video games
Mobile games
Educational video games
Video games developed in the United Kingdom